Rhabdotis picta is a species of Scarabaeidae, the dung beetle family. It was described by Hermann Burmeister in 1847.

References 

Cetoniinae
Beetles described in 1847